Forman may refer to:

Places:
Forman, North Dakota, city in Sargent County, North Dakota, United States
Forman, West Virginia, unincorporated community in Grant County, West Virginia, United States
Forman Glacier between Mount Franke and Mount Cole, in the Queen Maud Mountains of Antarctica
Forman Park, in Syracuse, New York

Surname:
A. G. Forman CBE (1910–1967), Chief of Naval Staff of the Ghana Navy
Al Forman (1928–2013), baseball umpire
Alexander A. Forman (1843–1922), American soldier in the American Civil War
Alison Forman (born 1969), Australian soccer player
Andrew Forman (1465–1521), Scottish diplomat and Archbishop
Arthur Forman (1850–1905), English schoolmaster and cricketer
Bill Forman (1886–1958), baseball player
Bruce Forman (born 1956), American jazz guitarist
Carol Forman (1918–1997), American actress
Charles William Forman (1821–1894), Presbyterian missionary in Pakistan
Christine Jones Forman, American astrophysicist
Craig Forman (born 1961), CEO of McClatchy
David Forman (general) (1745–1797), brigadier general of New Jersey militia
Denis Forman (1917–2013), Scottish television executive
Donnie Forman (born 1926), American basketball player
Frank Forman (1875–1961), English footballer
Fred Forman (1873–1910), English footballer
Frederick Forman (1884–1960), English cricketer
Gar Forman, American basketball executive
Gayle Forman (born 1978), American young adult fiction author
George V. Forman (1841–1922), founder of VanderGrift, Forman & Company
Harrison Forman (1904–1978), American photographer and journalist
Harry Buxton Forman CB (1842–1917), Victorian-era bibliographer and antiquarian bookseller
Henry James Forman (1879–1966), author famous for his 1933 book Our Movie Made Children
Henry Jay Forman, professor at the USC Leonard Davis School of Gerontology
Howard Forman (born 1946), American politician in the state of Florida
Humphrey Forman (1888–1923), English cricketer
Ira Forman (born 1952), director of the National Jewish Democratic Council
James Forman (1928–2005), figure in the Civil Rights Movement
Joey Forman (1929–1982), American comedian and comic actor
John Forman (British politician) (1884–1975), British insurance agent and politician
John Forman (martyr), Protestant martyr burned at the stake in East Grinstead, England in 1556
John Forman (Nova Scotia politician) (1798–1832), Canadian lawyer, judge and political figure
John Forman (sport shooter) (1925–1998), American sports shooter
John Forman (trade unionist) (1823–1900), British trade unionist
Justus Miles Forman (1875–1915), American novelist and playwright
L. J. Forman (1855–1933), Republican President of the West Virginia Senate
Lewis Leonard Forman (1929–1998), British botanist
Melissa Forman (born 1970), American radio and TV personality
Miloš Forman (1932-2018), Czech film director, screenwriter, actor, and professor
Miriam Forman, American astrophysicist
Miroslav Forman (born 1990), Czech ice hockey player
Mitchel Forman (born 1956), jazz and fusion keyboard player
Nigel Forman (1943–2017), British Conservative politician
Oscar Forman (born 1982), Australian basketball player
Paul Forman (born 1937), American curator
Peter Forman (born 1958), CEO of the South Shore (MA) Chamber of Commerce
Phillip Forman (1895–1978), American lawyer and judge
Rab Forman, Scottish solicitor and Conservative Party politician
Ric Forman, American winemaker, vineyard manager and consultant
Richard Forman, landscape ecologist
Robert Forman (died 1530), late medieval Scottish churchman
Robert K. C. Forman, professor of religion at the City University of New York
Ron Forman (born 1948), head of the Audubon Nature Institute
Ruth Forman, American poet
Sadie Forman (1929–2014), South African teacher, librarian and anti-apartheid activist
Simon Forman (1552–1611), Elizabethan astrologer, occultist and herbalist
Sol Forman (1903–2001), American restaurateur
Stanley Forman (born 1945), American photojournalist
Terry Forman (born 1948), Australian rugby player
Thomas Forman (priest) (1885–1965), Archdeacon of Lindisfarne
Thomas Forman (reformer) (1493–1528), early English reformer, President of Queens' College, Cambridge
Thomas Marsh Forman (1809–1875), Confederate politician
Tom Forman (actor) (1893–1926), American film actor, director, writer, and producer
Tom Forman (cartoonist) (1936–1996), American comic strip cartoonist
Tom Forman (footballer) (1879–1911), footballer
Tom Forman (producer), television producer
Werner Forman (1921–2010), Czech photographer
William St. John Forman (1847–1908), U.S. Representative from Illinois

Given name:
Forman S. Acton (1920–2014), American computer scientist, engineer, educator and author
Forman Brown (1901–1996), leader in puppet theatre, early gay novelist
Ezekiel Forman Chambers (1788–1867), American politician
William Forman Creighton (1909–1987), bishop of the Diocese of Washington
Robb Forman Dew, American author

Cornelius Forman Hatfield (1828–1910), merchant, shipbuilder, ship owner and political figure in Nova Scotia, Canada
Robert Forman Horton (1855–1934), British Nonconformist divine, born in London
Arthur Forman Balfour Paul (1875–1938), Scottish architect
Frazier Forman Peters (1895–1963), American builder and architect specializing in stone houses
Stanley Forman Reed (1884–1980), American attorney, United States Solicitor General
Robert Forman Six (1907–1986), CEO of Continental Airlines
Forman Waye (1886–1967), Canadian merchant, machinist and political figure
Joshua Forman Wilkinson (1798–1862), lawyer and first Postmaster of Bogardus Corners, Cossit's Corners and Salina in Central New York

Fictional characters:
Eric Forman (That '70s Show), a character in That '70s Show
Kitty Forman, a character in That '70s Show
Laurie Forman, a character in That '70s Show
Red Forman, a character in That '70s Show

See also 
Brown-Forman Corporation
11333 Forman, an asteroid named for Miloš Forman
H. Forman and Son, salmon smokehouse in London
Forman School, in Litchfield, Connecticut, US
Foreman (disambiguation)
Furman (disambiguation)